Lichen scrofulosorum  is a rare tuberculid that presents as a lichenoid eruption of minute papules in children and adolescents with tuberculosis. The lesions are usually asymptomatic, closely grouped, skin-colored to reddish-brown papules, often perifollicular and are mainly found on the abdomen, chest, back, and proximal parts of the limbs. The eruption is usually associated with a strongly positive tuberculin reaction.
Of the three tuberculids, the incidence of lichen scrofulosorum was found to be the lowest (2%) in a large study conducted in Hong Kong. This highlights its rarity and significance as an important marker of undetected tuberculosis.

See also 
 Tuberculid
 List of cutaneous conditions

References

External links 

Mycobacterium-related cutaneous conditions